Marivic Velaine Morelos Meneses (born October 18, 1995) is a Filipino volleyball player who currently plays for the Cignal HD Spikers in the Premier Volleyball League. She was a member of the Philippines women's national under-23 volleyball team which competed in the 2015 Asian Women's U23 Volleyball Championship.

Clubs 
  Cagayan Valley Lady Rising Suns (2015)
  Generika-Ayala Lifesavers (2016–2020)
  Petro Gazz Angels (2021)
  Cignal HD Spikers (2022)

Awards

Individual
 2014 Shakey's V-League 11th Season 1st Conference "Best Blocker"
 2014–15 UAAP Season 77 "Best Blocker"
 2015 Shakey's V-League 12th Season Open Conference "1st Best Middle Blocker"
 2016 Shakey's V-League 13th Season Reinforced Open Conference "1st Best Middle Blocker"
 2018 PSL All-Filipino Conference "1st Best Middle Blocker"
 2021 Premier Volleyball League Open Conference "1st Best Middle Blocker"
 ''2022 Premier Volleyball League Open Conference "2nd Best Middle Blocker"

References 

1995 births
Living people
Middle blockers
University Athletic Association of the Philippines volleyball players
Philippines women's international volleyball players
University of Santo Tomas alumni
Filipino women's volleyball players
Competitors at the 2021 Southeast Asian Games
Southeast Asian Games competitors for the Philippines